Elisabeth Helene von Vieregg (4 May 1679 – 27 June 1704), Countess of Antvorskov, was a Danish noble and lady-in-waiting of German origin. She was the royal mistress of King Frederick IV of Denmark and, later, his first morganatic wife by bigamy.

Biography 
She was the daughter of Prussian minister Adam Otto von Vieregg from Mecklenburg, the Prussian ambassador in Copenhagen from 1698 to 1706. Her mother was Anna Helena von Wolfersdorf. Elisabeth Helene was made lady-in-waiting to Princess Sophia Hedwig of Denmark, and entered into a relationship with Frederick, who became King the same year (1699).

The relationship was initially a secret, but was discovered in 1701 after a letter from her father, defending their relationship, was made public. On 6 September 1703 she was secretly married to Frederick IV, who thereby committed bigamy (his queen consort, Louise of Mecklenburg-Güstrow, was still alive), and was given the estate Antvorskov and the title Countess of Antvorskov. The church authorities had not forbidden the king to engage in polygamy, as there were doctrines based on biblical polygamy of Hebrew patriarchs.

She gave birth to a son, Frederik Gyldenløve (8 June 1704 – 9 March 1705), and died in childbirth. Frederick IV gave her an elaborate public funeral. After her death she was replaced as royal mistress by Charlotte Helene von Schindel, her lady-in-waiting.

See also 
 Margarethe von der Saale
 Julie von Voß
 Sophie von Dönhoff

References 
 Dansk biografisk leksikon

1679 births
1704 deaths
18th-century Danish women
Danish ladies-in-waiting
Deaths in childbirth
Mistresses of Frederick IV of Denmark
Wives of Frederick IV of Denmark
Morganatic spouses
Danish countesses
18th-century Prussian women